Deng Xiaoling (born August 26, 1974 in Deyang, Sichuan) is a female Chinese softball player. She competed at the 2000 Summer Olympics and at the 2004 Summer Olympics.

Biography
In the 2000 Olympic softball competition, Xiaoling finished fourth with the Chinese team. She played all eight matches as infielder.

Four years later she finished fourth again with the Chinese team in the 2004 Olympic softball tournament. She played all eight matches as infielder again.

External links
 Profile at Yahoo Sports
 
 
 
 

1974 births
Living people
Olympic softball players of China
People from Deyang
Softball players at the 2000 Summer Olympics
Softball players at the 2004 Summer Olympics
Softball players
Sportspeople from Sichuan
Asian Games medalists in softball
Softball players at the 1998 Asian Games
Softball players at the 2002 Asian Games
Medalists at the 1998 Asian Games
Medalists at the 2002 Asian Games
Asian Games gold medalists for China
Asian Games silver medalists for China